George Fox Steedman (1871–1940) was an inventor and businessman. He was the president of Curtis Manufacturing Co., a foundry and machine shop, and built Casa del Herrero.

Life 
Steedman attended the Manual Training School and Washington University in St. Louis, and then graduated magna cum laude from Harvard in 1892. He became president of the family pneumatic machinery business, Curtis Manufacturing Company, in 1903. Steedman married Carrie Robb Howard in 1903, and their two daughters, Katherine and Medora, were born respectively in 1904 and 1909. Steedman retired from Curtis Manufacturing Co. on Armistice Day, 1918.

In the 1920s he and his wife built Casa del Herrero in California as a summer home, first moving into the house on the day of the 1925 Santa Barbara earthquake. In 1930 they made it their permanent residence. After Steedman died in 1940, Carrie Steedman remained in the house until her death in 1962.

Steedman and his wife are interred at Bellefontaine Cemetery.

Philanthropy 
 In 1926 George Fox Steedman and his sister-in-law established the James Harrison Steedman Traveling Fellowship in Architecture at Washington University in memory of his late brother.
 Steedman endowed the George Fox Steedman Architectural Collection, an architectural library at the St. Louis Public Library, in 1928. The library contains about 1500 books, and Steedman left an endowment so the library can continue expanding the collection. Some of the books date back to the 16th century.

Family 
Steedman was the middle of three brothers.

References 

1871 births
1940 deaths
American businesspeople
20th-century American inventors
Washington University in St. Louis alumni
Harvard University alumni
People from St. Louis
Burials at Bellefontaine Cemetery